Orsola Nemi (born Flora Vezzani; 11 June 1903 – 8 February 1985) was an Italian writer and translator.

Biography 
As a girl, Nemi moved to La Spezia with her father, an infantry officer. He died on the Karst Plateau on October 15, 1915. At three years of age, Nemi fell ill with poliomyelitis. She survived but was marked by the disease for the rest of her life.

Henry Furst, a celebrated United States writer transferred to Italy to work for the New York Times. Nemi and he fell in love and were married. After meeting Furst, he helped to launch her literary career. Nemi met the editor Eugenio Montale, who published her poetry in the  review. From her publications, she was assigned to collaborate on the enormous Dizionario delle Opere e dei Personaggi. She also collaborated with writer Leo Longanesi and translated for him many French authors, including Alexis de Tocqueville, Honoré de Balzac, and one work by Gustave Flaubert.

Nemi's career stretched from the 1930s to the 1980s. She wrote novels, short stories, fables, essays, and prayers and wrote for publications like Gazzetta del Popolo, Il Messaggero, L'Osservatore Romano, Il Tempo, and Il Borghese. She also wrote for the theater: in 1961, she wrote Camicie Rosse to celebrate the centenary of the Proclamation of the Kingdom of Italy.

After the death of her husband in 1967, she composed Il meglio di Henry Furst in his honor. In 1972, Nemi wrote the pamphlet I Cristiani Dimezzati, in which she criticized the modernism of the Catholic church after the Second Vatican Council. In 1980, she finished a work she had begun with Furst: a biography of Catherine de' Medici.

Name 
Nemi's birthname was Flora Vezzani. Her pen name, Orsola Nemi, is derived from the day that her father died, October 15, 1915, which is dedicated to Sant'Orsola. The second half of her name is an abbreviation for the Latin word "Nemini", to symbolize her shy and independent nature.

Publications

Writing and editing 
Rococò, Milan, Bompiani, 1940
Cronaca, Milan, Bompiani, 1942
Nel paese di Gattafata, ed. Documento, 1944; Bompiani, 2017
Lena e il Bombo, Milan, Rosa e Ballo, 1944
Anime Disabitate, Roma Atlantica, 1945
Maddalena della Palude, Milan, Longanesi, 1949
Rotta a nord, Firenze, Vallecchi, 1955
I Gioielli Rubati, Milan, Bompiani, 1958
Il sarto stregato, Milan, Ceschina, 1960
Camicie rosse, Milan, Edizioni del Borghese, 1961
Le Signore Barabbino, Milan, Rizzoli, 1965
Taccuino di una donna timida, Milan, Edizioni del Borghese, 1969
Il tesoro delle Galline, Milan, I.P.L, 1970
L'Astrologo distratto, Rome, ed. Volpe, 1971
I Cristiani Dimezzati, Milan, Rusconi, 1972
Caterina Dè Medici, Milan, Rusconi, 1980
Henry Furst, Il meglio di Henry Furst, edited by Orsola Nemi, preface by Mario Soldati, introduction by Ernst Jünger, Milan, Longanesi, 1970

Translations 
Gustave Flaubert, L'educazione sentimentale, Milan-Rome, Rizzoli, 1942
Scandali e personaggi: scelta dalle memorie di Saint-Simon, 2 vol., Rome, Documento Libraio Editore, 1944
John Reed, Dieci giorni che fecero tremare il mondo, Milano, Longanesi, 1946
Gustave Flaubert, Bouvard e Pécuchet, Collana La Gaja Scienza n.5, Milano, Longanesi, 1946
Ben Hecht, Il diavolo a New York, Collana La Gaja Scienza n.12, Milan, Longanesi, 1947
Evelyn Waugh, Sempre più bandiere, Milan, Bompiani, 1949
Arthur Rimbaud, Una stagione all'inferno, Collana Piccola Biblioteca, Milan, Longanesi, 1951
Hermann Melville, Benito Cereno ed altri racconti, translated by O. Nemi and Henry Furst, Collana Piccola Biblioteca n. 32–34, Milan, Longanesi, 1951
Guy de Maupassant, Bel-Ami, BUR n.936, Milan, Rizzoli, 1955
Il Meglio di Baudelaire, preface by Henry Furst, Milan, Longanesi, 1955.
Mac Hyman, Tempi brutti per i sergenti, Milan, Bompiani, 195
Moses I. Finley, Il mondo di Odisseo, translation by Henry Furst and Orsola Nemi, Bologna, Cappelli, 1956
Albert Bessières, S. J., Vita di Gesù, Collana universale n.16/17, Bologna, Cappelli, 1958
Edmond and Jules de Goncourt, I Pittori francesi del XVIII secolo, Collana I Marmi n.14, Milan, Longanesi, 1959
Gustave Flaubert, Romanzi e Racconti (1869-1880) · Teatro, edited by Renato Prinzhofer and Silvio Giovaninetti, Milan, Mursia, 1961 [translation of La tentazione di Sant'Antonio and Tre racconti]
Vintilă Horia, Dio è nato in esilio: Diario di Ovidio a Tomi, Milano, Edizioni Il Borghese, 1961
Graham Greene, Inedito, Milano, Longanesi, 1962
Vintila Horia, La settima lettera, Milano, Edizioni Il Borghese, 1965
Michel de Saint Pierre, I nuovi preti, Milano, Edizioni Il Borghese, 1965
Edward Gibbon, Viaggio in Europa, Collana Vecchia Europa e nuova, Milano, Edizioni Il Borghese, 1965
Robert Brasillach, I sette colori, Milano, Edizioni Il Borghese, 1966
Dorothy M. Johnson, Tomahawk, Prefazione di Jack Schaefer, Collezione La ginestra n.125, Milano, Longanesi, 1972
Pearl S. Buck, La casa dei fiori, Milano, BUR Rizzoli, 1972

References

Further reading

External links 
 

1903 births
1985 deaths
20th-century Italian writers
20th-century Italian women writers
20th-century Italian translators